The Men From The Boys is a 2002 play by Mart Crowley, a sequel to his notable 1968 play The Boys in the Band. Set in a New York City apartment, the plot features friends gathering after a friend's memorial service.

Plot 
Characters introduced 35 years previously during The Boys in the Band are reunited. The group is brought back together at the funeral of Larry, who died of pancreatic cancer. They revisit the same apartment in Manhattan as the first play, and again begin talking and arguing. The dialog and story is relayed in "real time." New characters include Scott, a younger man dating Michael, who is poorly received by the group. Michael angrily defends Scott, and yells at the new character Jason, a "strident young activist" who had been romantically involved with Larry. Emory and Harold get involved in the arguments, while non-combative characters include Donald, Bernard, and Rick, a male nurse who had been harboring feelings for Larry. Among other details, three of the characters have joined Alcoholics Anonymous.

Creation
The play was written by Mart Crowley, famous for writing The Boys in the Band, which was groundbreaking for its frank portrayal of gay perspectives and lives in a repressive time, prior to the cultural acceptance of gay rights later in the 1960s. Crowley stated that he had always declined recommendations to write a sequel, until he felt enough time passed where he knew what had likely happened to the characters. It was his first play since Avec Schmaltz in 1984. The original score was composed by Larry Grossman, known for A Doll's Life.

Productions
Its world premiere was on October 26, 2002 at San Francisco's New Conservatory Theater Center, under artistic direction by Ed Decker. It was billed as a "sequel play." Opening officially for review on November 9, 2002, it was presented in two acts with a running time of two hours and twenty minutes. Rick Sinkkonen and Sarah Ellen Joynt handled set. It ran until December 8.

Main cast
Russ Duffy as Michael
Olen Christian Holm as Scott, a "pretty boy" dating Michael
Owen Thomas as Jason, a young activist
Michael Patrick Gaffney as Emory
Will Huddleston as Harold
Peter Carlstrom as Donald, the group's remaining alcoholic
Lewis Sims as Bernard
Andrew Nance as Larry, a schoolteacher
Terry Lamb as Hank
Rajiv Shah as Rick, a young nurse

Reception
Variety noted the "lack of significant change" in the characters' demeanor as one of several major problems in the play; wondering why Michael, Harold, Emory, and the other characters had remained friends despite their years of backstabbing. The reviewer complained the characters seemed to have "resisted 35 years of social potential personal change," remaining single, "predatory," and ill-suited for long-term relationships. The critic perceived characters as "authorial mouthpieces" for outdated and racist sentiments; the production was further criticized for its staging and "ill-conceived" apartment set. Duffy was noted the best actor, with Michael portrayed as "poisonous yet occasionally poignant."

References

External reviews
Curtainup.com

Plays by Mart Crowley
LGBT-related plays
Off-Broadway plays
Plays set in New York City
Sequel plays
2002 plays